Vägar hem is a 2006 studio album by Anna Stadling & Idde Schultz. On the album, they perform less famous Swedish pop/rock songs from the 1970s and 1980s.

Track listing
Vägar hem
Inga gränser
Bröllopsdag
Sjunde himlen
Då känns det lite lugnare
Drömde
Kärlekens hundar
Öde stranden
Små duvor
Gnistrande snö
Ser du
Blå andetag

References 

2006 albums
Anna Stadling albums
Idde Schultz albums